Quercus mexicana is a species of oak. It is widespread in eastern Mexico from Chiapas to Tamaulipas.

Description 

Etymology
Mexicana means 'from Mexico'.

References

External links
photo of herbarium specimen collected in Nuevo León in 1991

mexicana
Plants described in 1809
Endemic oaks of Mexico
Trees of Chiapas
Trees of Puebla
Taxa named by Aimé Bonpland
Flora of the Sierra Madre Oriental
Flora of the Trans-Mexican Volcanic Belt